Gary McCutcheon (born Dumfries, 8 October 1978) is a Scottish professional footballer who retired in 2015. He is also Reserve Team Manager at Stranraer.

He began his career at Kilmarnock where he had spells on loan at Stenhousemuir and Clydebank.

He joined Larne in the Irish League in 2006. He has played in Northern Ireland ever since, moving to Portadown in 2007, Ballymena United in 2010 and Crusaders in 2012. While at Portadown, he won the Irish League Cup in 2008–09.

He was named Ulster Footballer of the Year for 2011–12.

McCutcheon scored his first goal for Crusaders on 27 August 2012, a penalty against Glebe Rangers in the League Cup. He scored his first league goal, also a penalty, in a 2–1 victory over Linfield at Windsor Park on 4 September. He scored a total of 22 goals in his first season with the Hatchetmen.

References

1978 births
Living people
Footballers from Dumfries
Association football forwards
Scottish footballers
Ulster Footballers of the Year
Kilmarnock F.C. players
Stenhousemuir F.C. players
Clydebank F.C. (1965) players
Portadown F.C. players
Dumbarton F.C. players
Berwick Rangers F.C. players
Stranraer F.C. players
Larne F.C. players
Ballymena United F.C. players
Wigtown & Bladnoch F.C. players
Crusaders F.C. players
NIFL Premiership players